Paul K. Frost (born 1970) is an American state legislator in the Massachusetts House of Representatives. He is an Auburn resident and a member of the Republican Party.He was first elected in 1996 at the age of 26 years. He represents the 7th Worcester District which comprises the Towns of Auburn, Millbury, Oxford (precincts 2&3), and Charlton (precinct 4).

See also
 2019–2020 Massachusetts legislature
 2021–2022 Massachusetts legislature

References

External links
Campaign website
Official Government Website

Living people
Republican Party members of the Massachusetts House of Representatives
People from Auburn, Massachusetts
21st-century American politicians
1970 births